Harwick is a town within Springdale Township in Allegheny County, Pennsylvania, United States. As of the 2020 census, it had a population of 850.

Demographics

References

Census-designated places in Allegheny County, Pennsylvania
Census-designated places in Pennsylvania